Fox Sports World may refer to:
Fox Soccer, an American television specialty channel, originally named Fox Sports World
Fox Sports World (Canada), a Canadian television specialty channel